Autolycus may be:

 Autolycus, renowned thief and grandfather of Odysseus
 Autolycus, son of Deimachus, Thessalian and Argonaut
 Autolycus of Athens (5th century BC), Athenian sportsman
 Autolycus (areopagite) (4th century BC), Athenian judge
 Autolycus of Pitane, ancient Greek mathematician

Autolycus may also refer to:

 Autolycus (comics), a Marvel Comics character
 Autolycus (crater), a lunar crater named after Autolycus of Pitane
 Autolycus (submarine detector), a detector for diesel fumes, used for submarine detection during the Cold War
 Ad Autolycum (Apology to Autolycus), writing of Theophilus of Antioch
 A character in The Winter's Tale by William Shakespeare
 A character in the Hercules and Xena: Warrior Princess television programs. 
 Autolycus, the pet jackdaw of fictional detective Albert Campion
 Pen name of South Australian journalist Charles Richard Wilton